Peter Frederick Carter-Ruck (26 February 1914 – 19 December 2003) was an English solicitor, specialising in libel cases. The firm he founded, Carter-Ruck, is still practising.

Biography

Personal life
Carter-Ruck was educated at St Edward's School, Oxford. He spent three months in Germany during the 1930s, observing the rising popularity of Adolf Hitler and attending a rally in Freiburg. Upon his return, he trained and qualified as a solicitor.

His daughter Julie Scott-Bayfield is also a libel lawyer.

Career
Carter-Ruck's first major case was defending the Bolton Evening News successfully against a libel action brought by the Labour MP Bessie Braddock, who, the paper had claimed, had danced a jig in Parliament.

In December 1995, Carter-Ruck acted for the royal nanny Tiggy Legge-Bourke in the matter of an allegation against her by Diana, Princess of Wales, that she had aborted Prince Charles's child.

Criticism
In 1980, the Daily Express editor Derek Jameson was advised by Carter-Ruck that if he sued the BBC over their portrayal of him in a Week Ending sketch, he would win at least £25,000 in damages. The barrister in the case, David Eady QC, however advised Carter-Ruck to accept the BBC's offer to settle for £10 plus costs. Carter-Ruck did not disclose this advice to his client. The jury found the broadcast defamatory, but also fair comment and Jameson had to pay costs, receiving a bill for £41,342.50 from Carter-Ruck. Jameson learned by chance of the QC's advice and Carter-Ruck's former partner David Hooper claimed that "Carter-Ruck told him a string of lies". Carter-Ruck later claimed that he did not want to undermine Jameson's morale in court.

References

External links
 'The Carter-Ruck chill', The Guardian comment, December 2003
 Peter Carter-Ruck obituary, Daily Telegraph, 22 December 2003

1914 births
2003 deaths
People educated at St Edward's School, Oxford
English solicitors
20th-century English lawyers
People from Steyning